The Habitable Exoplanet Observatory (HabEx) is a space telescope concept that would be optimized to search for and image Earth-size habitable exoplanets in the habitable zones of their stars, where liquid water can exist. HabEx would aim to understand how common terrestrial worlds beyond the Solar System may be and determine the range of their characteristics. It would be an optical, UV and infrared telescope that would also use spectrographs to study planetary atmospheres and eclipse starlight with either an internal coronagraph or an external starshade.

The proposal, first made in 2016, is for a large strategic science missions NASA mission. It would operate at the Lagrange point L2.

Overview 

In 2016, NASA began considering four different space telescopes as the next Flagship (Large strategic science missions). They are the Habitable Exoplanet Observatory (HabEx), Large Ultraviolet Optical Infrared Surveyor (LUVOIR), Origins Space Telescope, and Lynx X-ray Surveyor. In 2019, the four teams turned their final reports over to the National Academy of Sciences, whose independent Decadal Survey committee advises NASA on which mission should take top priority.

The Habitable Exoplanet Imaging Mission (HabEx) is a concept for a mission to directly image planetary systems around Sun-like stars. HabEx will be sensitive to all types of planets; however its main goal is to directly image Earth-size rocky exoplanets, and characterize their atmospheric content. By measuring the spectra of these planets, HabEx will search for signatures of habitability such as water, and be sensitive to gases in the atmosphere potentially indicative of biological activity, such as oxygen or ozone.

In 2021, the National Academy of Sciences released its final recommendations in the Decadal Survey. It recommended that NASA consider a new 6-meter (20-foot) aperture telescope combining design elements of LUVOIR and HabEx. The launch date was set for 2040, and the budget was estimated to be $11 billion.

Science drivers and goals 
HabEx's prime science goal is the discovery and characterization of Earth-sized planets in the habitable zones of nearby main sequence stars, it will also study the full range of exoplanets within the systems and also enable a wide range of general astrophysics science.

In particular, the mission will be designed to search for signs of habitability and biosignatures in the atmospheres of Earth-sized rocky planets located in the habitable zone of nearby solar type stars.

With a contrast that is 1000 times better than that achievable with the Hubble Space Telescope, HabEx could resolve large dust structures, tracing the gravitational effect of planets. By imaging several faint protoplanetary disks for the first time, HabEx will enable comparative studies of dust inventory and properties across a broad range of stellar classifications. This will put the Solar System in perspective not only in terms of exoplanet populations, but also in terms of dust belt morphologies.

General astronomy 
General astrometry and astrophysics observations may be performed if justified by a high science return while still being compatible with top exoplanet science goals and preferred architecture. A wide variety of investigations are currently being considered for HabEx general astrophysics program. They range from studies of galaxy leakiness and inter-galactic medium reionization through measurements of the escape fraction of ionizing photons, to studies of the life cycle of baryons as they flow in and out of galaxies, to resolved stellar population studies, including the impact of massive stars and other local environment conditions on star formation rate and history. More exotic applications include astrometric observations of local dwarf galaxies to help constrain the nature of dark matter, and precision measurement of the local value of the Hubble Constant.

The following table summarizes the possible investigations currently suggested for HabEx general astrophysics:

Preliminary desired specifications 

Based on the science drivers and purpose, the researchers are considering direct imaging and spectroscopy of reflected starlight in the visible spectrum, with potential extensions to the UV and the near infrared parts of the spectrum.

An absolute minimum continuous wavelength range is 0.4 to 1 μm, with possible short wavelength extensions down below 0.3 μm and near infrared extensions to 1.7 μm or even 2.5 μm, depending on the cost and complexity.

For characterization of extraterrestrial atmospheres, going to longer wavelengths would require a  starshade that would launch separately on a Falcon Heavy, or a larger telescope in order to reduce the amount of background light. An alternative would be to keep the coronagraph small. Characterizing exoplanets at wavelengths shorter than ~350 nm would require a fully UV-sensitive high contrast optical train to preserve throughput, and will make all wavefront requirements more stringent, whether for a starshade or a coronagraph architecture. Such high spatial resolution, high contrast observations would also open up unique capabilities for studying the formation and evolution of stars and galaxies.

Biosignatures 
HabEx would search for potential biosignature gases in exoplanets' atmospheres, such as  (0.69 and 0.76 μm) and its photolytic product ozone. A further infrared capability to ~2.5 μm would allow to search for secondary features such as methane that may be consistent with biological processes. Pushing even further in the UV may also allow distinction between a biotic, high-O2 atmosphere from an abiotic, -rich atmosphere based on the ozone absorption of 0.3 μm.

Molecular oxygen can be produced by geophysical processes, as well as a byproduct of photosynthesis by life forms, so although encouraging,  is not a definite biosignature, unless it is considered in its environmental context. I.e., while O2 production to ~20% of our atmospheric content seems to be part of life as we know it on Earth, too much oxygen is actually poisonous to life as we know it and could easily be created by planetary situations like a incredibly deep world spanning ocean.

References

External links 
 Final report 2019 at JPL/NASA
 HabEx documents at JPL/NASA

Space telescopes
Infrared telescopes
Exoplanet search projects
Proposed astrobiology space missions
Proposed NASA space probes